Augusta Heritage Festival is a music and heritage festival held each summer at the Davis and Elkins College, Elkins, West Virginia. Over 20 years old, this three week festival covers music, dance and crafts relating to 10+ themes. These themes include: 
Old-Time music
Bluegrass
Cajun music and Zydeco music
Irish
Blues
Dance, including Contra, Cajun and Zydeco, Irish
Stone, wood and metal working
and more.

The festival includes concerts, shows, dances and instruction, lasting five consecutive weeks every summer, typically in July and August.  The instruction, by well known musicians and craftsman in each area, is at beginning to expert levels.  Participants come from all over the world.

During the fall each year (the week of October 23, in 2006) there is a week of Old-Time music; in the spring, a week of dulcimer.  Both of these weeks draw from around the country, and feature prominent musician/instructors.

See also
List of bluegrass music festivals
List of blues festivals

References

External links
 Augusta Heritage Web Site

Music festivals in West Virginia
Dance festivals in the United States
Bluegrass festivals
Summer festivals
Tourist attractions in Randolph County, West Virginia
Folk festivals in the United States
Dance in West Virginia
Performing arts in West Virginia
Elkins, West Virginia